Telenica (branded as TN8) is a nationwide state-run terrestrial television channel from Nicaragua, founded by Nicaraguan businessman Carlos Briceño in 1992. The channel was bought by Juan Carlos Ortega Murillo in late 2009, yet it was not made public until January 2010, the change in ownership led to a change in profile. TN8 is one of Nicaragua's main channels.

Before nationalization, Telenica, S.A. was also the owner of Radio 8, a local radio station. Canal 8 has the number one news program in the country (Crónica TN8), and it also has the number one sports show in the country.

In January 2010, the television channel was sold to private investors for an undisclosed amount.  Local news reports have alleged that the buyers were family members of President Daniel Ortega.

History

1950s and 60s
Channel 8 was the first TV channel to go on air in Nicaragua, being founded by Somoza García on July 15, 1956, though according to the 1957 Television Factbook, the station started in August that year, before suspending its operations in October. The channel did not have an instant success, given that television sets were not available for much of the Nicaraguan population. By 1962, it was  believed to operate under the YNSA-TV calls.

During the channel's early years, the channel carried a significant number of sports broadcasts, including soccer and baseball matches, with the aim of competing with radio. In 1961, the channel improved its equipment and its coverage extended to the Pacific area. Channels 8 and 6 merged in 1962. It is unknown when did the channel cease operations under government control.

As a private channel under Carlos Briceño
In the early 1990s, the Nicaraguan television monopoly held by the dissolved Sistema Sandinista de Televisión, thereby split in two companies, one for each channel (Canal 2 and Canal 6), came to its end, and the license to operate channel 8 (reactivated, as the channel had operated before) was given to Telenica, which was founded by Carlos Briceño, a former Univisión correspondent in Miami and later worked at Sistema Nacional de Televisión (Canal 6), on February 3, 1992, beginning operations on December 9 that same year, though some sources claim it started broadcasting in July. When the channel started, it had the aim of being an alternative to the existing channels, nonetheless the channel operated with limited human resources, prompting the channel to rely heavily on imported programming, provided that the financial resources were sufficient. The equipment was obtained from bank loans and donations from international aid agencies. In the mid-90s, Telenica/TN8 eyed for a possible reconversion to an all-news channel.

Under Briceño's control, its programming was aimed to the family audience, concentrating on news broadcasting, informational programming, sports and commentary, specials, series and musical shows. Its high standards of content and productions made it a favorite channel among Nicaraguan viewers. "A synonym of objectivity, credibility and experience, their renowned journalists bring us the most complete information every evening on local and international events". TN8 produced in the latter years of Briceño's administration, an average 5.5 hours of live news programming, for a monthly average of 121 hours, and for national content overall, 13.5 daily hours for a monthly average of 297 hours. While the other channels specialized in telenovelas and movies, TN8 was heavily specialized in news and current affairs programming, motivated by the success of its newscasts.

In 2004, it was reported that TN8 had the highest ratings among the local TV channels, Noticiero Independiente also had surpassed Canal 2's TVNoticias.

In early 2005, its newscast Noticiero Independiente, surpassed the ratings of Sábado Gigante and the telenovelas on Canal 2.

Nationalization
In late 2009, TN8 was acquired by Juan Carlos Ortega Murillo, son of president Daniel Ortega, however it was not officially announced to the public until January 2010. The channel was bought for a sum of US$9.7 million, relying on funding from Albanisa, a company with mixed shares from Venezuela and Nicaragua's state-run petrol companies. TN8 therefore became private property of Juan Carlos Ortega. Human rights organizations criticized the sale of Telenica, as the details of the sale were kept in secret and that the presidential family showed a clear lack of transparency. The negotiations with Albanisa were held for months, as one of the three potential options for the sale of the channel, including a negotiation related to a debt the channel has been accumulating since 2000. Briceño confirmed on January 14, 2010 that the channel was set to be under the Juan Carlos Ortega administration effective January 25.

The new administration initiated a rebranding process from its first week in control of the channel. One of the channel's main shows under the Briceño administration, Esta Semana, was replaced with Sin Fronteras, hosted by the pro-government presenter William Grigsby, international news reports from Telesur and excerpts of speeches from Daniel Ortega during commercial breaks. There was a massive concern over the future of the channel, with many speculating over a potential rebrand to ALBA-TV, and with further concerns about the fact that 51% of the channel was under Venezuelan control, which was illegal by the law. Grigsby's Sin Fronteras was cancelled on February 11, 2010, as the new owner was changing the format of the channel, from a predominantly news service to an entertainment channel, with telenovelas and movies.

On September 6, 2010, the newscasts that existed under the Briceño administration (Noticiero 24 Horas, Noticiero Independiente), after being subjected to a change of contents to align it with the FSLN, were replaced by a new one, Crónica TN8. 

Related to the change in content, the channel started buying a high number of imported television series and movies, mostly from the United States and Japan, setting deals with international production companies (Warner Bros., 20th Century Fox, Viacom, Toei Animation, etc. including independent production companies), this included a volume deal with Viacom to provide content for a children's programming slot, Hora Nick. In 2015, Álvaro Rocha, TN8's director of programming, stated that the channel's programming was 20% internal and 80% external, competing with cable, and also had imports in English (with Spanish subtitles), a strategy that "worked very well" for the channel.

According to a 2020 investigation by Reuters, TN8 was owned by Yadira Leets, wife of Rafael Ortega (owner of state-run radio station La Nueva Radio Ya). It's unknown if Leets was involved in the 2010 purchase of the channel.

Programming
Current programming on TN8 includes:
Crónica TN8 (news)
Estudio TN8 (analysis)
8 Deportivo (sports news)
Rebeldes (weekend afternoon program for the youth)
El Lobby (video games and related topics)
Hora Nick (kids)
Hogar y Estilo
International feature films
E-sports tournaments

La Rock 22
Juan Carlos Ortega started UHF channel 22 on December 23, 2015, assigned to another company he controls, Difuso Comunicaciones. The channel was sanctioned on July 17, 2020 by the United States Department of Treasury, owing to such sanctions, advertising slots on the channel stopped. At the time of the sanctions, much of the programming consisted of US imports. Juan Carlos Ortega subsequently renamed the channel to Rock FM (after the radio station) and switched its to predominantly rock music videos to evade the sanctions.The channel was taken off the air on July 29, 2020 from cable operators. At an unspecified date, the channel resumed operating under its current name, La Rock 22. The channel is alongside TN8 engaged in the promotion of events like Rock City, with support from the government platform Nicaragua Emprende.

Controversies

Zeta Gas affair
In July 1998, Mexican oil company Zeta Gas sued the channel due to its airing of a 60 Minutes report about Zeta Gas' ties to drug traffickers.

Under the Juan Carlos administration
In September 2020, Juan Carlos Ortega Murillo tweeted about a situation involving the buying of the Dragon Ball and Saint Seiya anime franchise to the channel that took place in 2011. Toei Animation offered them first-run prices, but Juan Carlos said that Canal 12 had aired the former before, and hadn't paid for the rights.

References

Television stations in Nicaragua
Spanish-language television stations
Television channels and stations established in 1956
Television channels and stations established in 1992